The Bache Ghulam,, is a tribe of Hazara people, largely found in Sangi Takht District of Daykundi Province, Afghanistan. They are a subtribe of the Daizangi.

Etymology
Bache Ghulam seems to mean "son of the manor".

Sub-tribes
 Bubak
 Gaoshak
 Ghulam Ali 
 Ismail 
 Kaum-i-Barfi 
 Kaum-i-Mizra 
 Kaum-i-Yari 
 Neka
 Shah Masid
 Waras

See also 
 List of Hazara tribes

References

Sources
Dai Kundi Province:Program for Culture and Conflict Studies, (US) Naval Postgraduate School.

Ethnic groups in Daykundi Province
Hazara tribes